The 2004 Mississippi State Bulldogs football team represented Mississippi State University during the 2004 NCAA Division I-A football season. The team's head coach was Sylvester Croom. The Bulldogs played their home games in 2004 at Davis Wade Stadium at Scott Field in Starkville, Mississippi.

Schedule

References

Mississippi State
Mississippi State Bulldogs football seasons
Mississippi State Bulldogs football